Lei Heng is a fictional character in Water Margin, one of the Four Great Classical Novels of Chinese literature. He ranks 25th among the 36 Heavenly Spirits, the first third of the 108 Liangshan heroes, and is nicknamed "Winged Tiger".

Background
The novel depicts Lei Heng as about seven chi tall, having a purplish face and sporting a big fan-like beard. Strong and skilled in martial arts, he could leap over relatively wide streams and creeks as well as fairly high walls. This talent earns him the nickname "Winged Tiger".

After being a blacksmith and a butcher, he becomes a chief constable in his native Yuncheng County (in present-day Heze, Shandong). He is a close friend of Zhu Tong, his partner chief constable, and Chao Gai, the headman of the Dongxi village in Yuncheng.

One night when out on a patrol, Lei Heng happens upon Liu Tang, who has fallen asleep in a rundown temple after getting drunk. Certain that Liu, with his strange and vagabond looks, is up to no good in the neighbourhood, Lei orders his men to tie him up before he could put up a fight. The party then stops for a rest in Chao Gai's manor. Chao secretly checks on Liu Tang, who is suspended in a side room. Liu tells him he has come to seek his collaboration to hijack some valuables in transportation to the Grand Tutor Cai Jing in the imperial capital Dongjing. Chao lies to Lei Heng that Liu is his nephew, thus winning the man's release. However, still bitter over the arrest, Liu catches up with Lei as he returns to his office and challenges him to a fight. Chao Gai arrives at the scene and stops the clash.

The hijackers eventually number seven with the participation of Wu Yong, Gongsun Sheng and the Ruan Brothers. With the help of Bai Sheng, who poses as a wine seller, they succeed in seizing the valuables at the Yellow Mud Ridge by drugging the escorts of the gifts led by Yang Zhi. But the authorities soon track down essential clues and the magistrate of Yuncheng sends Zhu Tong and Lei Heng to seize Chao Gai at his house. Both want to let Chao go but they hide the intention from each other. Zhu Tong prevails on Lei to enter Chao's house through the front door while he himself guards the back knowing Chao would come that way. Lei nevertheless makes noise to warn Chao as his men intrude into the house. As expected by Zhu, Chao and his gang leave by the back and escape with his help.

Becoming an outlaw
One day Lei Heng goes to hear a songstress named Bai Xiuying sing at a tea house. But he forgets to bring his wallet. So when Bai comes to collect money for her performance, Lei, who takes the best seat in the front row, is embarrassed. Bai and her father Bai Yuqiao pass some unkind remarks at Lei, who loses his temper and hits the old man in anger. It turns out that Bai Xiuying is having an affair with the magistrate of Yuncheng. So, Lei Heng is arrested following complaint by Bai. With a cangue fastened around his neck, he is further humiliated by being made to stand tethered outside the county office.

Lei Heng's elderly mother brings food for him and gets into a quarrel with Bai Xiuying when the songstress refuses to let her untie his son. Bai slaps Lei Heng's mother, causing Lei, a filial son, to slam his cangue on to her head, killing the woman. Exiled to Jizhou (薊州; present-day Ji County, Tianjin) on a manslaughter charge, Lei is escorted there by Zhu Tong.  On the way, Zhu releases Lei, who seeks refuge in Liangshan Marsh taking along his mother.

Campaigns and death
Lei Heng is appointed as one of the leaders of the Liangshan infantry after the 108 Stars of Destiny came together in what is called the Grand Assembly. He participates in the campaigns against the Liao invaders and rebel forces in Song territory following amnesty from Emperor Huizong for Liangshan.

In the battle at Deqing County (in present-day Huzhou, Zhejiang) in the campaign against Fang La, Lei Heng is slain by the enemy general Si Xingfang. He is posthumously awarded the title "Martial Gentleman of Loyalty".

See also
 List of Water Margin minor characters#Lei Heng's story for a list of supporting minor characters from Lei Heng's story.

References
 
 
 
 
 
 
 

36 Heavenly Spirits
Fictional characters from Shandong